Giovanni De Min (born May 28, 1940 in Asmara, Eritrea) is a retired Italian professional football player.

Sport Life

Born in Asmara (Italian Eritrea), he was considered an Italian Eritrean football player when young teenager. In the late 1950s he moved with his family back to Italy. In 1959 started to be professional in the Triestina.

He played for 3 seasons (33 games) in the Serie A for Hellas Verona F.C. and A.S. Roma.
 
He is considered one of the best players of the Hellas Verona team in History.

See also
 Italian Eritreans

References

External links
 Photo and life of De Min (in Italian)

1940 births
Living people
Eritrean footballers
Italian footballers
Serie A players
U.S. Triestina Calcio 1918 players
Pisa S.C. players
Hellas Verona F.C. players
A.S. Roma players
U.S. Pistoiese 1921 players
Association football goalkeepers